Sodian Gujar (Urdu: سوڈی گجر) is a village, union council, and administrative subdivision of Jhelum District, in the Punjab Province of Pakistan. It is part of Pind Dadan Khan Tehsil.

References 

Populated places in Tehsil Pind Dadan Khan
Union councils of Pind Dadan Khan Tehsil